Méav Ní Mhaolchatha, mononymously known as Méav, is an Irish singer, songwriter and recording artist specialising in the traditional music of her homeland. She was one of the original soloists in the musical ensemble Celtic Woman, which has sold over six million albums. Her solo albums have reached the Billboard World Music Top 10. She sings in multiple languages: English, Irish, French, Latin, Italian and German.

Music career
Meav came from a musical family and began singing at a young age. She began singing professionally shortly after graduating from Trinity College Dublin with a law degree.

Between 1994 and 1998 Méav was a member of the Irish chamber choir Anúna. As a choral singer and soloist, she recorded four albums with Anúna: Omnis (1995), Omnis Special Edition (1996), Deep Dead Blue (1996), and Behind the Closed Eye (1997). In 2006 a collection of her solo and choral work with Anúna, Celtic Dreams, was released on Valley Entertainment Records. She appeared as a member of Anúna in Riverdance: The Show.

She subsequently toured the United States as a soloist with the Irish RTÉ Concert Orchestra. She also toured South Africa as a soloist with Lord of the Dance.

She recorded her first and eponymous solo album in 1999 which had global success and led to concert tours in Japan and South Korea.

Méav gained musical stardom as a founding member of the group Celtic Woman in 2004. Her singing is a prominent element of Celtic Woman's three CDs, Celtic Woman, Celtic Woman: A Christmas Celebration, and Celtic Woman: A New Journey. In 2005, Méav was expecting her first child and took maternity leave to await the birth of her first daughter, Anna. During tours, she was replaced by Irish singer Deirdre Shannon. In 2006, she returned to record the New Journey CD and DVD and toured extensively with the group in the US and Japan in 2006 and 2007. She has been featured in Celtic Woman: The Greatest Journey Essential Collection.

In 2007, following the filming of Celtic Woman's Christmas DVD at the Helix, Dublin, Méav left Celtic Woman to concentrate on her solo career. She performed a series of solo concerts in New England, USA.

In 2009, she returned to the stage performing in her native Dublin to rave reviews. She also gave birth to her second daughter Catherine and recorded "Where the Sunbeams Play" for the Disney film Tinker Bell and the Lost Treasure.

In 2010, she was a special guest of Órla Fallon's Celtic Christmas concert in Nashville singing "Do You Hear What I Hear?" in a duet with Fallon, her solo version of "O Holy Night" accompanied by harp and the finale song "Here We Come A-wassailing" with the rest of the cast including American singing stars David Archuleta and Vince Gill, recorded, aired on PBS and released on CD and DVD.

Méav participated in a concert of world music at Chambord Castle, France, entitled "Divinas", along with Yulia Townsend and Persian-born Israeli singer Rita.

Méav was also featured as a guest soloist on the Celtic Woman Christmas album Home for Christmas. This was the first time she had appeared with Celtic Woman since she left the group in 2007. She appeared in the Celtic Woman PBS special, Home for Christmas, which was recorded on 7 August 2013.

In January 2012, Méav took part in the television special, Quest Beyond the Stars which took place at Abbey Road Studios, London.

She released a new solo album, The Calling, on Warner Music in Autumn 2013.

Meav again rejoined Celtic Woman temporarily for their North American 10th anniversary tour from 6 March to Easter 2015.

Méav rejoined Celtic Woman as their vocal director for their 2018 Homecoming album.

Personal life
She and her husband, Tom Clinch, have two daughters. At age 12, their daughter Catherine Clinch won the Best Actress Award at the 2022 IFTAs for her lead role in Colm Bairéad's Irish-language film An Cailín Ciúin.

Discography
Solo albums

With Celtic Woman

With Yulia and Rita

References

External links

Meav.ie – Official website

Celtic Woman members
Musicians from Dublin (city)
Opera crossover singers
Living people
Irish-language singers
Alumni of Trinity College Dublin
French-language singers
Latin-language singers
20th-century Irish women singers
1974 births
21st-century Irish women singers